Conac or CONAC may refer to:

 Konak (Sečanj), known in Romanian as Conac, a village in Serbia
 Continental Air Command, or ConAC, in the United States

See also 
 Gilbert-Amable Faure-Conac, French army officer
 Connac, a commune in France
 Konak (disambiguation)